The men's freestyle 60 kilograms is a competition featured at the 2002 World Wrestling Championships, and was held at the Azadi Indoor Stadium in Tehran, Iran from 6 to 7 September 2002.

Results

Preliminary round

Pool 1

Pool 2

Pool 3

Pool 4

Pool 5

Pool 6

Pool 7

Pool 8

Pool 9

Knockout round

 Harun Doğan of Turkey originally won the gold medal, but was disqualified after he tested positive for Ephedrine.

References

Men's freestyle 60 kg